The 2021 General Tire #AnywhereIsPossible 200 was the eighth race of the 2021 ARCA Menards Series season and the 37th iteration of the event. The race was held on Friday, June 25, 2021, in Long Pond, Pennsylvania, at Pocono Raceway, a 2.5 miles (4.0 km) triangular permanent course. The race took the scheduled 80 laps to complete. At race's end, Corey Heim of Venturini Motorsports would win a chaotic race to win his fourth career ARCA Menards Series win and his third of the season. To fill out the podium, Ty Gibbs of Joe Gibbs Racing and Drew Dollar of Venturini Motorsports would finish second and third, respectively.

Background 

The race was held at Pocono Raceway, which is a three-turn superspeedway located in Long Pond, Pennsylvania. The track hosts two annual NASCAR Sprint Cup Series races, as well as one Xfinity Series and Camping World Truck Series event. Until 2019, the track also hosted an IndyCar Series race.

Pocono Raceway is one of a very few NASCAR tracks not owned by either Speedway Motorsports, Inc. or International Speedway Corporation. It is operated by the Igdalsky siblings Brandon, Nicholas, and sister Ashley, and cousins Joseph IV and Chase Mattioli, all of whom are third-generation members of the family-owned Mattco Inc, started by Joseph II and Rose Mattioli.

Outside of the NASCAR races, the track is used throughout the year by Sports Car Club of America (SCCA) and motorcycle clubs as well as racing schools and an IndyCar race. The triangular oval also has three separate infield sections of racetrack – North Course, East Course and South Course. Each of these infield sections use a separate portion of the tri-oval to complete the track. During regular non-race weekends, multiple clubs can use the track by running on different infield sections. Also some of the infield sections can be run in either direction, or multiple infield sections can be put together – such as running the North Course and the South Course and using the tri-oval to connect the two.

Entry list

Practice

Open practice 
An open session practice session of five hours would start on Thursday, June 24 at 9:00 AM EST. The practice was optional to any ARCA driver competing in the race.

First and final practice 
The first and final 45-minute practice session was held on Friday, June 25, at 2:15 PM EST.

Qualifying 
Qualifying was held on Friday, June 25 at 4:00 PM EST. The qualifying session was a timed session.

No drivers would fail to qualify- but, due to Van Alst's practice crash, he would not set a lap in qualifying, nor compete in the race.

Full qualifying results

Race results 

*Van Alst would eventually be scored as last while not competing, as he had competed in some of the pre-race activities.

References 

2021 ARCA Menards Series
NASCAR races at Pocono Raceway
General Tire AnywhereIsPossible 200
General Tire AnywhereIsPossible 200